High Life is the fourth studio album by guitarist Brian Tarquin, released in October 2001 and the final one he would record for Instinct records. The album was recorded in Los Angeles at Tarquin's studio Jungle Room and in New York at his composing partner, Chris Ingram's studio, the Farm. Tarquin veered back to his rock fusion roots with the songs Razor's Edge and Spartacus. However giving into the record company's pressure for radio friendly songs the album produced the singles Riders on the Storm, originally recorded by The Doors, Celtic Tales and Charlemagne. Although the album reached the Top 40 charts at Smooth Jazz radio, Tarquin became disenchanted with the inconsistencies and water downed music of the format. Soon after the album came out he asked to be released from the record contract to pursue his pet roctronica project Asphalt Jungle while establishing his full-time composing career in television and film.  Tarquin also went on to form the record imprint BHP Music to release the Guitar Master Series.

Track listing

Personnel
Brian Tarquin – all guitars
Chris Ingram – keyboard, drum programming bass
Cliff Lyons – saxophone

References

External links
 
 
 
 

2001 albums
Brian Tarquin albums
Instinct Records albums